Franz-Paul Decker (June 26, 1923 – May 19, 2014) was a German-born conductor.

Life 
Decker was born in Cologne, Germany, where he studied at the Hochschule für Musik with Philip Jarnach and Eugen Papst. He made his conducting debut at the age of 22 at the Cologne Opera, and four years later was appointed to the Staatsoper Wiesbaden and subsequently to the positions of conductor of the Wiesbaden Symphony Orchestra and Generalmusikdirecktor in Bochum. In 1948, Decker was introduced to the composer Richard Strauss at a card game of whist. Strauss casually mentioned that he had just finished orchestrating four songs he had recently composed (the Four Last Songs).

Decker was highly regarded for his performances of Richard Wagner, Richard Strauss, Anton Bruckner, Max Reger and Gustav Mahler. He conducted the world premieres of dozens of orchestral works by Canadian composers, and conducted 85 different operas during his career.

Decker was Music Director of the Municipal Orchestra of Bochum (1956–1964), the Rotterdam Philharmonic Orchestra (1962–1967), the Montreal Symphony Orchestra (1967–1975), the Barcelona Symphony Orchestra (1985–1991), and the New Zealand Symphony Orchestra (1991–1996, as chief conductor). He served as Artistic Advisor to the Calgary Philharmonic Orchestra (1975–1977) and the Winnipeg Symphony Orchestra (1980–1982). He was Principal Guest Conductor of Ottawa's National Arts Centre Orchestra (1991–1999) and the Edmonton Symphony Orchestra (2003–2004).

Among the soloists he collaborated with were Arthur Rubinstein, Emil Gilels, Shura Cherkassky, Clara Haskil, Ida Haendel, Martha Argerich, Hélène Grimaud, Elisabeth Schwarzkopf, Jessye Norman, Dame Kiri Te Kanawa, and Jon Vickers.  His television broadcast of a Christmas concert with Luciano Pavarotti and orchestra, filmed at Notre-Dame Basilica in Montreal in 1978 was broadcast annually around the world.

In 1975 he was awarded an honorary doctorate from Concordia University. He died in Montreal, Canada.

References

1923 births
2014 deaths
German expatriates in Canada
German expatriates in the Netherlands
German male conductors (music)
Hochschule für Musik und Tanz Köln alumni
New Zealand Symphony Orchestra people
German expatriates in New Zealand
20th-century German conductors (music)
20th-century German male musicians